Hsinchu City is represented in the Legislative Yuan since 2008 by one at-large single-member constituency (Hsinchu Constituency,).

Current district
 Hsinchu City

Legislators

Election results

2016

References 

Constituencies in Taiwan
Hsinchu